Narva Museum is a museum in Narva, Estonia. The museum is composed of the Narva Castle, the Northern Yard, and the Narva Art Gallery.

In summer 2020, new exhibition was opened in Narva Castle. This exhibition gives overview of Narva from the 13th century to the beginning of the 20th century.

The Northern Yard depicts the district of artisans, who worked in Narva since 17th century.

The Narva Art Gallery was opened in 1991.

References

External links
 

Art museums and galleries in Estonia
Buildings and structures in Narva
1991 establishments in Estonia
Art museums established in 1991